David John Redl (born February 1, 1981) is an American lawyer and government official who was serving as the Assistant Secretary for Communications and Information at the United States Department of Commerce. Prior to assuming this role, he was the chief counsel at the United States House Committee on Energy and Commerce. Redl previously served as director of regulatory affairs at CTIA, the largest wireless industry trade group in the United States. In 2017, The Hill included Redl on its list of "16 people to watch in tech".

References

External links
 Official biography from the U.S. Department of Commerce

1981 births
Living people
People from Rhinebeck, New York
Pennsylvania State University alumni
Columbus School of Law alumni
21st-century American lawyers
Trump administration personnel
United States Department of Commerce officials